A war bride is a foreign woman who married military personnel in times of war.

War bride or War brides may also refer to:

"War Bride" (Hercules: The Legendary Journeys), episode of television series Hercules: The Legendary Journeys
War Brides (1916 film), a lost American silent film
War Brides (1980 film), a Canadian television film
The War Bride, 2001 Canadian/British drama film

See also
War (disambiguation)
Bride (disambiguation)

War Brides Act, act in the United States which allows alien spouses, natural children, and adopted children of members of the United States Armed Forces to enter the United States as non-quota immigrants
GI Brides (2013 book) true war stories about war brides to US soldiers
G.I. War Brides (1946 film) U.S. comedy